Amadou Tidiane Tall (born 22 June 1975, in Kadiogo) is a Burkinabé football player who last played for Etoile Filante Ouagadougou.

Tall previously played for USM Blida in the Algerian Championnat National.

He was part of the Burkinabé 2004 African Nations Cup team  that finished bottom of their group in the first round of competition, thus failing to secure qualification for the quarter-finals.

1998–2003 Etoile Filante Ouagadougou
2003–2006 USM Blida
2006–present Etoile Filante Ouagadougou

References

External links

1975 births
Living people
People from Centre Region (Burkina Faso)
Burkinabé footballers
Burkina Faso international footballers
Association football midfielders
Étoile Filante de Ouagadougou players
USM Blida players
2000 African Cup of Nations players
2004 African Cup of Nations players
Burkinabé expatriate footballers
Burkinabé expatriate sportspeople in Algeria
Expatriate footballers in Algeria
21st-century Burkinabé people